The pearly-vented tody-tyrant (Hemitriccus margaritaceiventer) is a species of bird in the family Tyrannidae.

It is found in Argentina, Bolivia, Brazil, Colombia, Paraguay, Peru, Uruguay, and Venezuela.

Its natural habitats are subtropical or tropical dry forests, subtropical or tropical moist lowland forests, and subtropical or tropical dry shrubland.

References

pearly-vented tody-tyrant
Birds of South America
pearly-vented tody-tyrant
Taxonomy articles created by Polbot